Power of a Woman is the debut studio album by the rapper Tairrie B, released on January 1, 1990 for Ruthless Records and distributed through MCA Records. It was mostly produced by Tairrie B, with guest stars such as Schoolly D, Bilal Bashir & Greg Kuehn lending their talents to more than a few tracks.  Despite gaining rather favorable reviews, it did not manage to chart on Billboard; however, two singles ("Murder She Wrote" & "Swingin' Wit' T) placed themselves at numbers 27 & 28 respectively, on the Hot Rap Singles chart.

Track listing
"Swingin' wit' T" 4:30 (Tairrie B., Maurice White, Phillip Bailey, Larry Dunn)
"Anything You Want" feat. Eazy-E 3:57 (Tairrie B., Schooly D)
"Vinnie tha' Moocha" feat. Everlast 4:01 (Cab Calloway, Irving Mills, Clarence Gaskill)
"Step 2 This" 6:06 (Tairrie B., Bilal Bashir)
"Murder She Wrote" 3:15 (Tairrie B., Quincy Delight Jones III)
"Packin' a Punch" 5:25 (Tairrie B., Art Neville, Joseph Modeliste, Leo Nocentelli)
"Let the Beat Rock" 3:33 (Jones III)
"Player" feat. Eazy-E, Dr. Dre & The D.O.C. 5:35 (Tairrie B., Greg Kuehn)
"School's In" 4:49 (Tairrie B., Schooly D., Joe Tex)
"Ruthless Bitch" 8:01 (Tairrie B.)

1990 debut albums
Tairrie B albums
Ruthless Records albums